Firvale is a community in the Bella Coola Valley of the Central Coast region of British Columbia, Canada, located at the confluence of Burnt Bridge Creek and the Bella Coola River, northeast of the valley's main community of Bella Coola.

References

Unincorporated settlements in British Columbia
Bella Coola Valley
Pacific Ranges